Heidelberg Raceway was an American auto racing track which was built near Heidelberg, Pennsylvania in Scott Township, Allegheny County, approximately  southwest of Pittsburgh, Pennsylvania. It held weekly races and numerous special events between 1948 and 1973. It held four NASCAR Strictly Stock/Grand National Series and one NASCAR Convertible Division race between the 1940s and 1960s. In 1960, Heidelberg became the first track to fall off NASCAR's tour. The land is now occupied by a shopping center called Raceway Plaza.

History
The track was the brainchild of the original Wrights Sea Food Inn owner, Ike Wright. It was originally constructed between 1947 and 1948 to be used as a horse racing establishment, with help and financial backing by Pittsburgh Steelers founder Art Rooney.  When horse racing was not legalized in Pennsylvania., the track was converted into a place for autos to compete.  The original track was a 1/2-mile dirt track that eventually had a 1/4-mile track cut into its infield. The tracks shared part of a straightaway that existed in front of the main grandstands.  Over the final years of the tracks existence, there was also a figure-8 course being used within the quarter-mile section of the track.

The first races happened at the track in May 1948. The first event was almost rained out, but track officials had drivers pilot their race cars around the course, using the heat buildup from the vehicle's tires to dry the track surface. Once the races began, the air became dusty from the cars racing around the track. The Observer-Reporter interviewed fans after the track closed, and they reported that the air was so dusty that fans could rarely see the race cars come down the straightaways. Thursday nights were selected because the Pittsburgh Pirates Major League Baseball team had only three Thursday night baseball games that season. Midget cars were the first weekly series, featuring drivers Jimmy Bryan, Bill Schindler, Al Shaffer, and Billy Spear. They raced on the 1/4 mile inner track. Special events featured sprint cars on the 1/2-mile track. From 1950 until 1953, the track began hosting coupe racing under NASCAR sanction. In 1954, Ed Witzberger took over promotion of the track, and eventually formed the Pittsburgh Racing Association (PRA) which raced coupes up to five nights per week including Thursday nights at Heidelberg. Other tracks in the association included South Park Speedway, Monduke Speedway, and Clinton Speedway. Chris Economaki, was the track announcer for special events in the 1950s. The track featured coupes until 1961, then late models became the track's main class.

Witzberger had both tracks paved before the 1967 season.  At the end of the 1972 season, when track promoter Ed Witzberger and driver Tom Colella could not come to terms on a three-year lease, an agreement was reached where Colella would lease the track, for one year, in 1973. The track was permanently closed at the end of the 1973 season. In an interview in 2007, Colella cited the 1973 oil crisis and urban sprawl as factors in the decision. Ed Howe won the last race on the track, a 250-lap special event, in 1973. Herb Scott had won more championships at Heidelberg than any other driver with a total of ten season championships.

Nick Garin decided to build a Pennsylvania Motor Speedway in Imperial, Pennsylvania and he purchased many of the components from Heidelberg. He used the bleachers and fence from around the track at the new speedway. The site formally known as Heidelberg Raceway is now "Raceway Plaza"; a shopping strip mall that includes Walmart, Lowe's Home Improvement, Shop-N-Save, and Woltz & Wind Ford.

Other notable weekly drivers
 Dick Linder, NASCAR and USAC driver
 Joe Mihalic
 Norm Benning, Jr., ARCA driver
 Bud Middaugh
 Tom Colella
 Bob James former mechanic for Richard Petty
 Jody Ridley

Special Races

Tri-State 150
The PRA began hosting the Tri-State 150 as a special event on the 1/2-mile track after the regular season was completed. Winners included Herb Scott (1958), Gus Linder (1959), Joe Mihalic (1963) and Norm Benning, Sr. (1964). Benning said that the race winner won around $3000. "Today that would be nothing," Benning said. "It was big back then. I remember one time we had 186 cars for a weekend race. Heidelberg brought in cars from Ohio, Michigan, Indiana weekly. It was the best track and it paid the most money."

Gulf 250
The track later started hosting a second major special event in late October called the Pittsburger 200.  When the track was paved, it became the Pittsburger 250. The 250 began attracting pavement drivers from around the United States, including NASCAR driver Bobby Allison.

Gulf 100 
On August 2, 1973 Heidelberg hosted a NASCAR sanctioned event for the Grand National East Series.  The 100 lap event attracted several NASCAR regulars; including Tiny Lund, Bobby Allison, Cale Yarborough and Buddy Baker.  Local driver Tom Colella qualified fastest at slightly over 88 mph to start on the pole.  Colella led from start to finish to win $845 and the event by 2 laps over second place Tiny Lund who took home $685.  Bobby Watson, Jeff Faber, and Bruce Gould rounded out the top 5.

NASCAR races 
Heidelberg held the seventh event in the first season of NASCAR's Strictly Stock Series on October 2. Lee Petty, father of NASCAR's winningest driver Richard Petty, won his first NASCAR race at the track.  Petty had rolled his big boxy Buick Roadmaster earlier in the year at the Charlotte race, and brought a lighter weight number 42 Plymouth to the Heidelberg track. Petty beat local driver Dick Linder by five laps, the largest margin of victory throughout the 1949 season.  Bill Rexford finished third, followed by Sam Rice and Sara Christian to round out the top five. Christian's fifth place finish in that race was the highest finish by a woman driver in the top level of the NASCAR racing until March 5, 2011, when Danica Patrick finished 4th in the NASCAR Nationwide Series race at Las Vegas Motor Speedway.

At the track's final race for NASCAR's premier Grand National series in 1960, Lee Petty won with his son Richard Petty finishing second. There would be no father-son 1-2 finish until Bobby Allison beat Davey Allison at the 1988 Daytona 500.

Strictly Stock/Grand National

NASCAR Convertible Division

NASCAR Grand National East Series

Raceway Champions
 1954 - Buddy O'Connor
 1955 - Dick Linder
 1956 - Herb Scott
 1957 - Herb Scott
 1958 - Herb Scott
 1959 - Herb Scott
 1960 - Herb Scott
 1961 - Don Luffy
 1962 - Herb Scott
 1963 - Herb Scott
 1964 - Herb Scott
 1965 - Herb Scott
 1966 - Buddy O'Connor
 1967 - Herb Scott
 1968 - Harold Smith
 1969 - Harold Smith
 1970 - Jim Bickerstaff
 1971 - Tom Colella
 1972 - Ken Hemphill

Photo gallery

See also
 Bedford Speedway
 Eriez Speedway
 Lake Erie Speedway, Erie County, south of North East, Pennsylvania
 Nazareth Speedway
 Pocono Raceway

References

Bibliography 
  

Buildings and structures in Allegheny County, Pennsylvania
NASCAR tracks
Motorsport venues in Pennsylvania